Aspdin is a surname. Notable people with the surname include:

Joseph Aspdin (1778–1855), English cement manufacturer
William Aspdin (1815–1864), English cement manufacturer, son of Joseph

See also
 Aspin (disambiguation)